Dodd City Independent School District is a public school district based in Dodd City, Texas (USA).  The district has two schools Dodd City High School, serving grades 7-12, and Dodd City Elementary School, serving grades PK-6.

In 2009, the school district was rated "academically acceptable" by the Texas Education Agency.

References

External links
 

School districts in Fannin County, Texas